Ranjitha Menon is an Indian actress and model from Thrissur, Kerala who predominantly works in the Malayalam Movie Industry. She is more known for her role as a heroine in the movies Saajan Bakery Since 1962 and Pathrosinte Padappukal. Her role as Merin in the movie Saajan Bakery Since 1962 has been critically acclaimed by film critics.

Filmography

References

Living people
Actresses from Thrissur
21st-century Indian actresses
Indian film actresses
Actresses in Malayalam cinema
Year of birth missing (living people)